Content is the seventh full-length studio album by English band Gang of Four, released on 24 January 2011 on Grönland Records in Europe and the following day on Yep Roc Records in the US.  It was the last Gang of Four album to feature original vocalist Jon King. It was recorded at Andy Gill's central London studio, The Beauchamp Building.

Track listing
All tracks composed by Andy Gill and Jon King

Personnel
Gang of Four
Jon King - vocals, melodica
Andy Gill - guitar, vocals
Thomas McNeice - bass
Mark Heaney - drums
with:
Eddi Reader - backing vocals
Technical
Andy Gill, Sam Morton - engineer
Andy Gill, Jon King - artwork
Christian McGowan - CGI cover image

References

2011 albums
Gang of Four (band) albums
Yep Roc Records albums
Grönland Records albums
Albums produced by Andy Gill